Naistenjärvi (Russian alphabet Найстенъярви, from Karelian, Veps and Finnish meaning women's lake) is a rural municipality in Suoyarvsky District, in the Republic of Karelia, Russia.

References

Rural localities in the Republic of Karelia
Suoyarvsky District

Former urban-type settlements of Karelia